The 1924–25 Harvard Crimson men's ice hockey season was the 27th season of play for the program.

Season
With new coach Edward Bigelow behind the bench, Harvard received some potentially good news in the offseason. Yale's home building, the New Haven Arena, had burned down, leaving the team without a local venue. This would give Harvard an advantage over the Elis as all games between the two teams would be played at the Boston Arena. Additionally, the team lost only five players to graduation and those spots would be filled by men from an undefeated freshman team.

Harvard got a quick start on the season, defeating MIT 8–3 and Boston University 6–1, before taking on the Boston hockey Club. The 1–8 loss demonstrated that the team still had a ways to go, but the return of Hammond, Howard and Chase from their respective absences would help the team's fortunes.

When Harvard returned from their winter break they found Toronto waiting for them for the fourth consecutive year. This time, however, Harvard was able to put together a winning effort for the first time since 1913. After narrowly losing to another amateur club, Harvard got a leg up on Yale with a 3–2 overtime win, then followed that with a defeat of Princeton the following week. After keeping its intercollegiate record unblemished, Harvard had two chances to defeat its conference rivals and would need them when Yale evened the series with their own 3–2 win.

After keeping their intercollegiate championship hopes alive with a close victory over Dartmouth, Harvard faced Yale in a rubber match that was likely to decide the Triangular League and Intercollegiate championships. The two titans fought a defensive battle with Yale utilizing a similar form of line change as the Crimson. The gambit allowed the Bulldogs' top players to keep up with Harvard long into the night and, after regulation ended without a goal, overtime was required. Neither goaltender surrendered a marker in the two extra periods so a third, sudden-death period was needed. It took six minutes for Yale's Harrison Turnbull to score the only goal of the game and end Harvard's pursuit of a championship.

Harvard won their final game of the season, narrowly defeating Princeton, to finish in second place in the Triangular League.

Roster

Standings

Schedule and results

|-
!colspan=12 style=";" | Regular Season

References

Harvard Crimson men's ice hockey seasons
Harvard
Harvard
Harvard
Harvard
Harvard